Calymmaderus is a genus of beetles in the family Ptinidae. There are about 11 described species in Calymmaderus.

Species
These 11 species belong to the genus Calymmaderus:
 Calymmaderus advenus (Fall, 1905) i c g
 Calymmaderus amoenus (Fall, 1905) i c g
 Calymmaderus bibliothecarum (Poey, 1851) g
 Calymmaderus brevissimus (Pic, 1909) g
 Calymmaderus nitidus (LeConte, 1865) i c g b
 Calymmaderus oblongus (Gorham, 1883) g
 Calymmaderus obsoletus (Fall, 1905) i c g b
 Calymmaderus pudicus (Boheman, 1858) i c g
 Calymmaderus punctulatus (LeConte, 1865) i c g b
 Calymmaderus similis (Fall, 1905) i c g
 Calymmaderus solidus (Kiesenwetter, 1877) g
Data sources: i = ITIS, c = Catalogue of Life, g = GBIF, b = Bugguide.net

References

Further reading

External links

 

Ptinidae